Argyrosomus japonicus is a silvery to bronze-green colored fish, a member of the family Sciaenidae, which may grow up to  in length. It is known as Japanese meagre (FAO), mulloway or jewfish on the east coast of Australia, butterfish in South Australia, kingfish or river kingfish in Western Australia, and dusky/squaretail kob, dusky salmon, salmon, Kob, or kabeljou in South Africa, Ô-nibe (大鮸, オオニベ) in Japan. The name jewfish refers to its large otoliths, which are prized as "jewels" by some fishers.

Description
It has a copper-colored head and is silvery with a bronze-green dorsal surface and paler belly. It has a row of distinctive white spots running along the lateral line. The caudal fin is angular in juveniles but becomes more rounded in larger fish.

Distribution and habitat
Argyrosomus japonicus has an Indo-Pacific distribution occurring in coastal waters surrounding Australia, Africa, India, Pakistan, China and Japan. Adults are gregarious and are found over soft bottoms mainly beyond the surf zone, occasionally going inshore. Juveniles are exclusively found in shallow water and sometimes move into estuaries.

Mulloway/jewfish in Australia 
As explained above Argyrosomus japonicus, are commonly known by different names across Australia, but most Australians refer to them as mulloway or jewfish. They are a prized catch when it comes to fishing and are notoriously difficult to target. They are even fondly referred to as 'silver ghost', 'elusive jewfish', 'river kingfish', 'jewie', 'soapy' and 'silver slab'. Mulloway have a wide distribution in Australia, from the Gascoyne region on the west coast of Western Australia, around the southern coasts of the continent, and up to the Wide Bay–Burnett region on the east coast of Queensland.

According to the Department of Primary Issues for New South Wales:
Mulloway have been classified as Overfished in NSW since 2004/05 and a Recovery Program (RP) to assist the stock to rebuild was implemented on the 1st November, 2013.

The above recovery plan introduced changes to the "bag limits' on fish for both Recreational and Commercial fishing.

Later in 2018, NSW Minister for Primary Industries, Niall Blair commented:
Despite efforts by fishers, a recent scientific review showed Mulloway are still overfished. In order for stocks to recover, the review recommended that more action needed to be taken.

Recreational bag limits were further reduced to just one fish over 70 cm.

At  the same time that these new restrictions were introduced the sustainability and ethics of NSW's commercial fishing industry was being called into question after an alleged case of a commercial fisherman using a drone to target a school of mulloway.

Stock status
As of 2020, the stock status of mulloway in New South Wales is classified as 'depleted'. In South Australia and Western Australia, the stock status is 'sustainable'. In Queensland, the stock status is 'undefined'.

Habitat 
Mulloway or jewfish can be found from the brackish water up the top of estuaries down to the mouths, bays, rocks and beaches all the way out to offshore reefs. They can even be found in urban areas. They can be found under deep water marinas, boat moorings, bridges and jetties even shelving rocks and caves. They are accessible to the majority of Australian Recreational Anglers.

Diet 
Although described as a benthic carnivore, Mulloway are capable of feeding throughout the water column.  Mysid shrimp are important food items for smaller juvenile fish (<).  As the fish increase in size the diet changes to include small finned fish, then larger finned fish and squid and other cephalopods.

References

Sciaenidae
Fish of the Indian Ocean
Fish of the Pacific Ocean
Fish described in 1844
Taxa named by Hermann Schlegel
Taxa named by Coenraad Jacob Temminck